Jorge Luis Sicre-Gattorno (born  1958 in Havana, Cuba) is a Cuban-American painter.

Education
Sicre is a graduate of the University of California in Santa Barbara, United States.  His art work is in museum collections at the Housatonic Museum of Art in Bridgeport, Connecticut, the Museum of Modern Latin American Art in Washington, D.C., and in the Bass Museum in Miami Beach, Florida.

Family
Jorge Sicre-Gattorno is the grandson of Cuban sculptor Juan José Sicre and the relative of Cuba's premier Vangardia painter, Antonio Gattorno. His father, Jorge Sicre, was a cellist in the Cleveland Orchestra and then taught at the Juilliard School. His mother, Candita Gattorno, was a psychiatrist.  He grew up in Cleveland, Ohio.

Other relatives are José Gómez-Sicre, the late Cuban art critic and attorney; Francisco Gattorno, a Cuban actor; and Clemente G. Gomez-Rodriguez, a Cuban lawyer and writer.

Career
In addition to exhibitions in galleries across North America and Europe, Sicre's work has been featured on two high-end fashion accessory lines: Jenellen, Inc., and Icon Shoes, Inc.  His paintings were a highlight at an event at the Museo dell’Aeronautica Gianni Caproni in Trento, Italy, and were showcased in the museum's 2008 calendar.

Footnotes

References
 Jorge Sicre
Registro Social de la Habana 1958 (Molina y Cia, S.A.)

External links
 Artist's website

Cuban emigrants to the United States
Cuban painters
Modern painters
University of California, Santa Barbara alumni
Living people
1958 births